Ikeuchi (written: 池内) is a Japanese surname. Notable people with the surname include:

, Japanese actor
, Japanese politician
, Japanese footballer
, Japanese footballer

Japanese-language surnames